= Theon of Antioch =

Theon of Antioch (Ancient Greek: Θέων, romanized: Theōn) was an ancient Greek Stoic philosopher during 1st century CE. He was from Antioch in Cilicia (now part of Turkey).

Little is known about Theon. He is mentioned in Suda as a Stoic who wrote Socrates' defense speech, although he must have lived significantly after Socrates and Plato.
